Enjoy the Ride is the debut album by Marshall Dyllon, an American country music boy band. Their only studio album, it was released on Dreamcatcher Records, a label owned by Kenny Rogers. It produced two singles in "Live It Up" and "You", both of which charted on the Billboard country charts in 2000.

Track listing
"God Bless This Town" (Rory Bourke, Phil Vassar) - 3:30
Producer: Phil Vassar, Robert Byrne
"All I Wanna Do" (Ron Harbin, Richie McDonald, Anthony L. Smith) - 4:00
Producer: Michael D. Clute
"She's Like a Child"  (Matt Morris)  - 3:13
Producer: John Guess, Joe Chemay
"Live It Up" (Robert Byrne, Vassar) - 3:17
Producer: Phil Vassar, Robert Byrne
"You" (Jimmy Olander, Will Robinson, Aaron Sain) - 3:47
Producer: John Guess, Joe Chemay
"Closer to Heaven" (Bob DeMarco, Michael Egizi, Kenny Rogers Jr.) - 3:49
Producer: Bob DeMarco, Michael Egizi, Kenny Rogers Jr. for Planet One Productions
"Is She Gone" (Todd Michael Sansom) - 3:51
Producer: John Guess, Joe Chemay
"I'll Never Miss That Girl" (Reed Nielsen, Jeffrey Steele) - 4:07
Producer: Chris Farren
"We Got Love" (DeMarco, Egizi, Rogers Jr.) - 4:41
Producer: Bob DeMarco, Michael Egizi, Kenny Rogers Jr. for Planet One Productions
"Special Girl" (Sansom) - 3:34
Producer: Michael D. Clute
"So Bad" (Craig Bickhardt, Kip Lennon, Michael Lennon, Jack Sundrud) - 4:05
Producer: Brent Maher for Maher Productions
"Enjoy the Ride" (Sansom) - 3:27
Producer: Chris Farren

Personnel
Compiled from liner notes.

Marshall Dyllon
Daniel Cahoon - vocals
Jesse Littleton - vocals
Michael Martin - vocals
Paul Martin - vocals
Todd Michael Sansom - vocals, vocal arrangements

Additional musicians
Eddie Bayers - drums
Larry Beaird - acoustic guitar
Craig Bickhardt - acoustic guitar
Robert Byrne - acoustic guitar
Larry Byrom - acoustic guitar
Spencer Campbell - bass guitar
Jimmy Carter - bass guitar
Joe Chemay - bass guitar
Bob DeMarco - electric guitar
Dan Dugmore - steel guitar
Mike Durham – electric guitar
Michael Egizi - keyboards
Pat Flynn - acoustic guitar
Shannon Forrest - drums
Larry Franklin - fiddle, mandolin
Paul Franklin - pedal steel guitar
Sonny Garrish - pedal steel guitar
Tony Harrell - piano, Hammond B-3
Aubrey Haynie - fiddle
Kevin Haynie - banjo
Jeff King - electric guitar
Paul Leim - drums, percussion
Doug Livingston - pedal steel guitar
B. James Lowry - acoustic guitar
Brent Mason - electric guitar
Jerry McPherson - electric guitar
Steve Nathan - piano, keyboard, organ
Bobby Ogdin - keyboards
Russ Pahl - pedal steel guitar, Dobro, banjo
Kenny Rogers, Jr. - acoustic guitar
Matt Rollings - piano
Mark Selby - acoustic guitar
Chuck Tilley - percussion
Ilya Toshinsky - electric guitar
Biff Watson - acoustic guitar
Glenn Worf - bass guitar

References

2000 debut albums
Marshall Dyllon albums